The Tsolum River is a short river on Vancouver Island, British Columbia, Canada.  It joins the Puntledge River to form the Courtenay River in the City of Courtenay.

Name origin
Originally identified on Admiralty charts as "River Courtenay" and given as "Courtney River" by Dr. Robert Brown of the Vancouver Island Exploring Expedition, and as "the Slough known as Tsalum", it first appeared as the Tzolum River on a BC Lands map in 1895, and again in 1905.  The name Tsolum River was made official in 1922.

Loss of biodiversity 
In 1964, the Mount Washington Copper Mining Co. had moved into its watershed and began a small copper mine. By 1966, the company had left the area after extracting 940,000 tonnes of waste rock. Even though their mining lasted only three year, the repercussions of their mining practices can still be seen today. What was once a river that was sprawling with 15,000 Coho Salmon had depleted to only 14 by 1984.  In 1997 the  Tsolum River Task Force was formed by over 200 local residents with the goal of restoring Tsolum River's health and productivity.

References

Rivers of Vancouver Island
Mid Vancouver Island